Acanthogorgiidae is a family of cnidarians belonging to the order Alcyonacea.

Genera:
 Acanthogorgia Gray, 1857
 Anthogorgia Verrill, 1868
 Ascolepis
 Calcigorgia Broch, 1935
 Calicogorgia Thomson & Henderson, 1906
 Callicigorgia
 Cyclomuricea Nutting, 1908
 Muricella Verrill, 1868
 Versluysia Nutting, 1910

References

 
Holaxonia
Cnidarian families